Sigrid Ulbricht (née Heimann; born 25 July 1958) is a German former track and field athlete who competed in the long jump for East Germany. She was the champion at the IAAF World Cup and European Cup in 1981 and represented her country at the Olympic Games in 1980.

Career
Born in Klötze, Bezirk Magdeburg, she took up athletics and became a member of the SC Magdeburg sports club. Ulbricht originally competed in the women's pentathlon and recorded a best score of 4303 points in 1977. She rose to prominence in the long jump in 1980 with a runner-up finish at the East German Athletics Championships behind Siegrun Siegl. That year she was selected for the Moscow Olympics and finished seventh in the final.

Ulbricht's best season came in 1981. She was runner-up nationally, this time to Heike Drechsler, but claimed a series of international medals. At the 1981 European Athletics Indoor Championships she was the silver medallist behind her West German rival Karin Hänel. She won both the semi-final and final stages of the 1981 European Cup with bests of  then .

She had a daughter Anne Ulbricht who later went on to represent Germany in handball.

Ulbricht was among the athletes subject to East German state doping, with her documents being revealed by Brigitte Berendonk.

International competitions

See also
List of doping cases in athletics

References

External links

1958 births
Living people
People from Altmarkkreis Salzwedel
People from Bezirk Magdeburg
German female long jumpers
East German female long jumpers
Sportspeople from Saxony-Anhalt
Olympic athletes of East Germany
East German sportspeople in doping cases
Doping cases in athletics
Athletes (track and field) at the 1980 Summer Olympics
SC Magdeburg athletes